Perri Williams (born 21 June 1966) is an Irish racewalker. She competed in the women's 10 kilometres walk at the 1992 Summer Olympics.

References

External links
 

1966 births
Living people
Athletes (track and field) at the 1992 Summer Olympics
Irish female racewalkers
Olympic athletes of Ireland
Place of birth missing (living people)